The Indian Journal of  Physics is a monthly peer-reviewed scientific journal published by Springer Science+Business Media on behalf of the Indian Association for the Cultivation of Science. It was established in 1926 by C. V. Raman and covers applied physics, experimental physics, and theoretical physics. The editor-in-chief is Subham Majumdar.

Abstracting and indexing
The journal is abstracted and indexed in:
 Web of Science
 Astrophysics Data System
 Scopus
 SPIRES
 INSPIRE
 Chemical Abstract Service
 International Nuclear Information System
 SCImago Journal Rank
 ProQuest
 OCLC
 International Bibliography of Periodical Literature

According to the Journal Citation Reports, the Indian Journal of Physics had a 2020 impact factor of 1.947.

See also 
 Pramana

References

External links 
 

Physics journals
English-language journals
Monthly journals
Publications established in 1926
Springer Science+Business Media academic journals